Oxynopterini is a tribe of click beetles in the subfamily Dendrometrinae.

North American Genera
 Melanactes Leconte, 1854 g b
 Perissarthron Hyslop, 1918 b
Data sources: i = ITIS, c = Catalogue of Life, g = GBIF, b = Bugguide.net

References

Further reading

External links

 

Elateridae